Susan Enan is an English singer and songwriter.

Susan Enan is known for writing and performing the 2009 song "Bring on the Wonder" which was featured in the television show Bones. The song featured Sarah McLachlan on backing vocals, and was subsequently featured on both Enan's (Plainsong) and McLachlan's (Laws of Illusion) albums.

Enan's debut album, Plainsong, was released independently 2009 and was named in Paste Magazine's "Eight Criminally Underrated Albums From 2009" list and was listed as one of the top 50 albums from 2009 by Amie Street.

Biography
Susan Enan was born in Peterborough, Cambridgeshire, England. She went to university in Liverpool and studied for a music degree. After university, she moved to Belfast in Northern Ireland. She moved to New York City in 2005, and Nashville, Tennessee, in 2012.

In February 2010, after Susan gave a concert in a fan's house in Nashville, she began to get requests from all over the world for more house concerts. And so began the worldwide house concert tour.

Enan cites Woody Guthrie and Bob Dylan as influential to her.

Discography
1998: Inside (EP)
2000: #one (EP)
2002: Moonlight (EP)
2009: Plainsong

References

External links 
Official site
Interview at ctnmusic.com

Living people
Year of birth missing (living people)
English women singers